Elis Ingemar Eliasson (born 30 March 1939) is a Swedish Liberal People's Party politician with a long and diverse career, having served as government minister, county governor, member of the Parliament and royal court official.

Education and career 

Ingemar Eliasson was born in the village of Visnums-Kils, in Värmland County's Kristinehamn Municipality. He holds the degree of Master of Science in Business and Economics.

In 1976, Eliasson became Undersecretary of State, and served as such until 1980, when he became Minister of Employment. Following a career as member of the Parliament from 1982 where he was parliamentary leader of the Liberal People's Party from 1985 until 1990. At 1990 he became Governor of Värmland County, serving as such until 2002. On 1 September the next year, Eliasson was appointed Marshal of the Realm, the highest-ranking post he held. As Marshal of the Realm, Eliasson was responsible for the organization of the royal household and reported directly to King Carl XVI Gustaf. Having resigned the court office on 1 January 2010, he now functions as chancellor of the orders of chivalry.

In 2003, Eliasson chaired a Commission of Inquiry into the 1945 disappearance and subsequent death of the diplomat Raoul Wallenberg. His stated mission is to summarize Wallenberg's service in Hungary, his work, and legacy.

Honors and awards 
In 2006, the Swedish Council of America presented Eliasson with the Great Swedish Heritage Award in Karlstad, for promoting knowledge and understanding of the Swedish culture and the Swedish heritage in the United States. On 28 January 2010, the King awarded him H. M. The King's Medal, the 12th (largest) size with chain, at the Stockholm Palace.

References

External links 

|-

1939 births
Living people
Governors of Värmland County
Liberals (Sweden) politicians
Marshals of the Realm
Members of the Riksdag
Order of the Polar Star
Swedish Ministers for Employment
People from Kristinehamn Municipality